Devils Island is one of the twenty-two Apostle Islands of northern Wisconsin (USA), and has also been known as Louisiana Island (Henry R. Schoolcraft's 1820 map), Barney and Lamborn's Island (Asaph Whittlesey's 1871 map), Brownstone Island, and Rabbit Island.

The island is located in western Lake Superior off the Bayfield Peninsula, is centered at approximately 47°04'16.50" N 90°43'36.33" W and has a maximum elevation of 652' above sea level.  The island rises only 50' above Lake Superior's official elevation of 602'. It is 318 acres in area.

The island has no human inhabitants other than summer Park Service volunteers. It is managed by the National Park Service as part of the Apostle Islands National Lakeshore.

The politician and author Samuel Fifield wrote in 1899 that, "The Indians in the early days declared it to be the home of Matchimanitou, the "evil spirit," whom Kitchie-Manitouo, the "great spirit," had imprisoned there. Hence its name, Devils Island." Governor Fifield did not specify his source of information for this claim, and some modern Native scholars question the accuracy of this explanation.

When surf on the lake is heavy, the waves thunder and boom in the island's extensive sea caves. The rumbling can be heard even well away from the shoreline. Local residents claim that the Ojibwe (Chippewa) interpreted this noise as the sound of evil spirits.

The island is perhaps most visited for the dramatic rock formations and sea caves that wrap around its northern shore. It is popular with kayakers who enjoy meandering in and out of the caves on calm days. The caves were sculpted from the billion year old sandstone bedrock exposed through the island's surface. The red and gold sandstone was deposited over the area by wandering streams from western hills. The undulating of the climate over about a million year period laid a sandstone crust that is about 1800 feet thick. They are colorfully stratified. Similar to ripples on the sandy bottom of a lake or stream caused by wind, waves or current, the ripples on these rocks are from gentle waves that passed 1 billion years ago.

The Devils Island Light located at the northern end of the island is staffed by a volunteer ranger during the busy months of the summer. Accompanied by the volunteer, visitors may climb the tower, and go inside the original keeper's quarters, built in 1894. The lighthouse contains a 3rd order fresnel lens, the only Apostle Islands lighthouse to have its original lens. Close examination of the lens shows multiple cracks and damage that occurred when the US Coast Guard removed the lens in 1989. After local outcry and legal action, the Park Service was able to return the lens to the lighthouse in 1992.

Visitors are free to wander the grounds and enjoy many trails found on the island. Starting at the light station, they include a short trails to the east "landing", a loop trail to the west "landing" as well as a longer trail down the center of the island to the boathouse and dock at the south end.  To the east is an old engine house that was used to haul supplies up from the landing. The building, thought to have been finished in 1901, is the only one built of sandstone quarried from the island. The bulldozer that was used to make these trails can be found along the trail to the west landing. A rare heath rush (grass) found on Devil's Island is thought to have been carried to the island on the tracks of the army surplus bulldozer which was once used in Greenland.

The northern tip of Devils Island is the northernmost point of Wisconsin.

See also
 Devils Island Sandstone

Notes

External links
 Park Service Page for Devils Island
 2005 Volunteer Blog
 https://www.facebook.com/DevilsIslandLakeSuperior

Apostle Islands
Islands of Ashland County, Wisconsin